The Sherman and Merlene Bates House is a historic house at the southeast corner of Dawson and Echo Streets in Hardy, Arkansas.  It is a single story wood-frame house finished in sandstone veneer, with a gable roof.  The main facade has a projecting front gable section, which has a picture window on the left and the main entrance on the right.  A period garage, finished with the same stone, stands behind the house.

The house was built in 1947 for Sherman Bates, owner of a local bulk fuel oil facility, and is a high-quality local example of a post-World War II stone house.

The house was listed on the National Register of Historic Places in 2002.  An earlier house built for Bates in Hardy is also listed, as the Sherman Bates House.

See also
National Register of Historic Places listings in Sharp County, Arkansas

References

Houses on the National Register of Historic Places in Arkansas
Houses completed in 1947
Houses in Sharp County, Arkansas
1947 establishments in Arkansas
Bungalow architecture in Arkansas
National Register of Historic Places in Sharp County, Arkansas